Trumpets’ Republic is a documentary film directed by Stefano Missio.

Synopsis
This is a film documentary on Serbia, and the horns and brass.

In Serbia trumpets play in the popular feasts where people dance and sing, but they also play in funerals: trumpet music accompanies the deceased also in his last trip. Not surprisingly, the trumpet became an emotional part of the life of Serbian people.

Awards
It won as Special prize “for Talent” in the 2007 at “Saratov Sufferings 2007 - The International Documentary Drama Film Festival” (Russia).

See also
Balkan Brass Band
Guča trumpet festival

Notes

Bibliography

 Tom Haines, « Laughter reigns, war memories fade at annual Balkans brass festival », The Boston Globe, 2004-06-27
 Ivana Godnik, « Missio : "Così scoprimmo la Repubblica delle trombe" », Il Piccolo, 2006-01-21 .
 Alessandro Gori, « El país de las trompetas », La Vanguardia, Barcelona, suplemento 'Revista', 2006-10-01
 Lucia Sgueglia, « Un'altra Russia », Il Manifesto, 2007-12-22 p.16 p.17.

External links
Official site

2006 films
2000s Serbian-language films
Serbian musical films
Italian documentary films
2006 documentary films
Documentary films about musical instruments
Films set in Serbia
Documentary films about Serbia